Caywood (formerly Caywood Station) is an unincorporated community in Washington County, in the U.S. state of Ohio.

History
Caywood had its start in 1871 when the railroad was extended to that point. A post office called Caywood was established in 1871, and remained in operation until 1922. The community was named for the local Caywood family.

References

Unincorporated communities in Washington County, Ohio
Unincorporated communities in Ohio